Charles Henry Bartlett (October 15, 1833 – January 25, 1900) was an American lawyer and politician who served as Mayor of Manchester, New Hampshire and as a member and President of the New Hampshire Senate.

Bartlett was born in Sunapee, New Hampshire on October 15, 1833.

Bartlett married Hannah M. Eastmen of Croydon, New Hampshire on December 8, 1858. Hannah Bartlett died on July 25, 1890.  They had two children, a daughter Clara Bell Bartlett, and a son Charles Leslie Bartlett.

In June 1857, Bartlett was appointed clerk of the United States District Court for the District of New Hampshire.

Bartlett was elected Mayor of Manchester, New Hampshire in 1872. He resigned in February 1873 because of a federal government policy that barred officers from holding state or municipal offices.

Bartlett died in Manchester on January 25, 1900.

References

External links
 Gen. Charles H. Bartlett ; At Publications - Portraits of Legislators On State House Third Floor
 

1833 births
1900 deaths
Mayors of Manchester, New Hampshire
New Hampshire lawyers
Republican Party New Hampshire state senators
Presidents of the New Hampshire Senate
19th-century American politicians
People from Sunapee, New Hampshire
19th-century American lawyers